The Avon River, a perennial river of the Hawkesbury-Nepean catchment, is located in the Southern Highlands and Macarthur districts of New South Wales, Australia.

Course
The Avon River rises on the western slopes of the Illawarra escarpment, near Calderwood within the Wollongong local government area and flows generally north, reaching its confluence with the Cordeaux River, south of Wilton. The river descends  over its  course.

The river is impounded by Lake Avon, the largest of the four reservoirs within the Upper Nepean Scheme that supplies potable water for greater metropolitan Sydney. In 1963, the water supply was diverted to meet the increasing needs of the Illawarra region and now supplies all the Wollongong area.

See also

 List of rivers of New South Wales (A–K)
 Rivers of New South Wales
 Upper Nepean Scheme

References

External links

Rivers of New South Wales
Geography of Wollongong
Southern Highlands (New South Wales)